"Caught in the Middle" is a song by American rock band Paramore. It was released on June 26, 2018 through Fueled by Ramen as the fifth and final single off their fifth studio album After Laughter (2017). The track was co-written by lead vocalist Hayley Williams and guitarist Taylor York, and recorded in Nashville, Tennessee.

Composition
The genre of "Caught in the Middle" has been described as pop rock, new wave, synth-pop, ska and reggae. It contains bouncing drums and bass from band members York and Farro, and has been compared sonically to the early work of American rock band No Doubt.

Music video
The music video for "Caught in the Middle" was released on June 26, 2018, and was directed by Computer Team, who worked with the band on previous videos from After Laughter. The video features the band dancing on oranges, and trying to evade various other fruits. This video was intentionally made in VHS-quality. The visuals are an homage to A-ha's music video for "Take On Me".

As of October 2022, the music video for "Caught in the Middle" has over 9 million views on YouTube.

Personnel
Credits adapted from the album's liner notes.

 Kevin "K-Bo" Boettger – assistant engineer
 Dave Cooley – mastering engineer
 Carlos de la Garza – mixer, engineer
 Zac Farro – drums, bells, keyboards, percussion, background vocals
 Justin Meldal-Johnsen – producer, engineer, bass guitar, keyboards, programming
 Mike Schuppan – engineer, additional mixer
 Hayley Williams – vocals, keyboards, percussion, background vocals
 Taylor York – producer, additional mixer, engineer, guitar, keyboards, marimba, percussion, programming, background vocals

References

Songs written by Hayley Williams
2017 songs
Songs written by Taylor York
Paramore songs
American new wave songs
American synth-pop songs
Ska songs
Reggae songs